Basically may refer to:

"Basically", song by Lil Xan from Total Xanarchy 2018	
"Basically", song by Catfish & the Bottlemen from The Balance 2019